Joan Feigenbaum (born 1958 in Brooklyn, New York) is a theoretical computer scientist with a background in mathematics. She is the Grace Murray Hopper Professor of Computer Science at Yale University. At Yale she also holds a courtesy appointment in the Department of Economics. Feigenbaum co-invented the computer-security research area of trust management.

Education and career
Feigenbaum did her undergraduate work in Mathematics at Harvard University.  She became interested in computers during the Summer Research Program at AT&T's Bell Labs between her junior and senior years.  She then earned a Ph.D. in computer science at Stanford University, under the supervision of Andrew Yao, while working summers at Bell Labs.  After graduation she joined Bell Labs. She became the Hopper Professor at Yale in 2008.

Family
She is married to Jeffrey Nussbaum.  They have a son, Sam Baum. Baum was chosen as child's surname as the greatest common suffix of Feigenbaum and Nussbaum.

Awards and honors
In 1998 Feigenbaum was an Invited Speaker of the International Congress of Mathematicians in Berlin. In 2001 she became a fellow of the Association for Computing Machinery for her "foundational and highly influential contributions to cryptographic complexity theory, authorization and trust management, massive-data-stream computation, and algorithmic mechanism design." In 2012 she was named a fellow of the American Association for the Advancement of Science and, in 2013, a member of the Connecticut Academy of Science and Engineering. The Connecticut Technology Council chose her as a Woman of Innovation in 2012. She acts as one of the three award-committee members on ACM SIGecom test of time award.

References

1958 births
American women mathematicians
American women computer scientists
Living people
Theoretical computer scientists
Harvard College alumni
Stanford University alumni
Yale University faculty
Fellows of the American Association for the Advancement of Science
Fellows of the Association for Computing Machinery
American computer scientists
21st-century American mathematicians
20th-century American mathematicians
American women academics
20th-century women mathematicians
21st-century women mathematicians
20th-century American women
21st-century American women